David Lawrence Williams (born 20 November 1946 in Neath) is a Welsh former cricketer active from 1969 to 1977 who played for Glamorgan. He appeared in 151 first-class matches as a lefthanded batsman who bowled right arm fast medium pace. He scored 403 runs with a highest score of 37* and took 364 wickets with a best performance of seven for 60.

Notes

1946 births
Welsh cricketers
Glamorgan cricketers
Living people